Aroga rigidae is a moth of the family Gelechiidae. It is found in North America, where it has been recorded from Washington.

The larvae feed on Artemisia rigida.

References

Moths described in 1935
Aroga
Moths of North America